Mandave Kd is a village in Parner taluka in Ahmednagar district of state of Maharashtra, India.

Religion
The majority of the population in the village is Hindu-Maratha.

Economy
The majority of the population has 100% farming as their primary occupation.

See also
 Mandave – a village in Ratnagiri district, Maharashtra state in Western India
 Parner taluka
 Villages in Parner taluka

References

Villages in Parner taluka
Villages in Ahmednagar district